Oleg Antonovich Mikulchik (born June 27, 1964) is a Belarusian former professional ice hockey played in the National Hockey League for the Winnipeg Jets and the Mighty Ducks of Anaheim. Mikulchik played 37 regular season games, scoring 3 assists and collecting 37 penalty minutes. He represented the Soviet Union at the 1984 World Junior Ice Hockey Championships and Belarus at several World Championships and at the 2002 Winter Olympics.

Career statistics

Regular season and playoffs

International

External links

1964 births
Living people
Baltimore Bandits players
Belarusian expatriate sportspeople in Canada
Belarusian ice hockey coaches
Belarusian ice hockey defencemen
Expatriate ice hockey players in Russia
Fort Wayne Komets players
HC Dinamo Minsk players
HC Dynamo Moscow players
HC Khimik Voskresensk players
Metallurg Magnitogorsk players
HC Neftekhimik Nizhnekamsk players
Ice hockey players at the 2002 Winter Olympics
Long Beach Ice Dogs (IHL) players
Mighty Ducks of Anaheim players
Moncton Hawks players
New Haven Nighthawks players
Nürnberg Ice Tigers players
Olympic ice hockey players of Belarus
Soviet ice hockey defencemen
Ice hockey people from Minsk
Springfield Falcons players
Undrafted National Hockey League players
Winnipeg Jets (1979–1996) players
Belarusian expatriate sportspeople in Russia
Belarusian expatriate sportspeople in the United States
Belarusian expatriate sportspeople in Germany
Belarusian expatriate sportspeople in Ukraine
Belarusian expatriate sportspeople in Uzbekistan
Expatriate ice hockey players in the United States
Expatriate ice hockey players in Canada
Expatriate ice hockey players in Germany
Belarusian expatriate ice hockey people